Plymouth Albion Rugby Football Club are a rugby union club who play in Plymouth, England. The present club was founded in 1920 from a merger between Plymouth RFC (founded 1876) and Devonport Albion RFC (founded 1876). Since 2003 they have played their home games at The Brickfields stadium. Albion's traditional strip and club colours are white, strawberry (red or cherry) and green.

After thirteen seasons in the second tier of English rugby union, Plymouth Albion finished last in the 2014–15 RFU Championship, and currently play in National League 1.

Plymouth RFC
Formed 1876, the Plymouth Football Club, also known as Plymouth Chiefs, played at South Devon Place. In 1912, the Northern Union attempted to form a Western League of clubs in Devon and Cornwall. Huddersfield beat Oldham 31–26 in an exhibition game at South Devon Place in front of 7,000 spectators and as a result a meeting was held and the club joined the Northern Union. The first match under the new rules was lost, 22-17, against Coventry on Christmas Day. The club later re-emerged as part of a merger with Devonport Albion to become Plymouth Albion.

Devonport Albion RFC
Albion was formed in 1876 from apprentices at Devonport Dockyard and originally played at Devonport Park. After moving to Bladderly in 1887 they then moved to Home Park in 1893. The club stayed at Home Park for one season only, returning to Bladderley Lane in 1894, then, in 1896, Albion took a 14-year lease of Rectory grounds, (the current home of Devonport Services R.F.C.).

Current club

Devonport Albion continued at the Rectory until it merged with Plymouth RFC to become Plymouth Albion and moved in 1920 to Beacon Park. In 2003, they moved from the run-down Beacon Park ground to a newly built ground, The Brickfields, in Devonport. The Brickfields also has an adjacent athletics stadium.

Albion were a major force in English rugby union in the 1920s having five internationals on their books at one time. Around this time they attracted a crowd of 18,000 to a midweek game against Oxford University which established a record crowd for a club match in England which was not exceeded until the 1980s.

They were promoted to National Division One in 2002, and finished third in the 2003–04 season. Observers say it was Plymouth Albion's best position nationally since the 1920s. On their way to promotion, the team went on a two-season unbeaten streak of over 50 games, starting when the club was in Division Three South and ending after their promotion to National Division One.

The major local rivals are Exeter Chiefs who also have an impressive new stadium at Sandy Park perched above the services junction of the M5. Devon local derbies have become major popular events. Together these clubs have reinvigorated the passion for rugby in the county.

Albion currently play in the National League 1, the third tier of English club rugby. The club have financial problems and only avoided entering administration early in 2015 following a cash injection of £250,000 by local businesses. Albion entered administration on 8 April 2016 and were deducted 30 pts by the RFU. Following administration they were taken over by former players, Bruce Priday and David Venables who put forward a business case to the RFU. Since then, Priday has moved to pastures new, whilst Max Venables is the Club's Managing Director.

The club also has a successful women's team and a new Under 18s Academy. They played their first game against a Cornwall XV in February 2019, finishing 50 - 7 victors.

Current standings

Season summary

Honours
 Devon Senior Cup winners (23): 1889, 1891, 1892, 1893, 1895, 1905, 1906, 1908, 1909, 1910, 1911, 1912, 1913, 1914, 1921, 1974, 1977, 1983, 1984, 1985, 1986, 1987, 1988 
 Devon RFU Junior Cup winners: 1893 (reserve side)
 Courage League Division 3 champions: 1988–89
 National Division 3 South champions: 2000–01

Notable former players
 Martín Schusterman     –     Argentinian international flanker
 Aaron Carpenter    –   Canadian international flanker
 Justin Mensah-Coker     –     Canadian international wing
 Graham Dawe     –     Former England international hooker
 Jimmy Peters     –     England fly-half
 Dan Ward-Smith     –     England number 8
 Rupeni Nasiga    –    Fiji international lock
 Nat Saumi     –     Fiji international full back
 Jané du Toit     –     Namibian international prop
 David Palu    –     Tongan international scrum-half
 William Davies     –     Wales international centre
 Rory Watts-Jones    –    Wales 7s international player
 Tom Bowen    –    Current England 7s international player
 Sean-Michael Stephen    –    Canadian international back row forward
 Sam Matavesi    –    Northampton Saints and Fiji international hooker
 Brett Beukeboom    –    Canada and Cornish Pirates second row

See also
 Devon RFU

Notes

References

External links
 Plymouth Albion official site

1876 establishments in England
English rugby union teams
Rugby clubs established in 1876
Rugby union in Devon
Sport in Plymouth, Devon